Sincara is a genus of moths in the family Sesiidae.

Species
Sincara eumeniformis Walker, 1856

References

Sesiidae